Stemmer may refer to:
 Stemmer, in stemming, the automated process which produces a base string in an attempt to represent related words
 Walburga Stemmer (1892–1928), German fruit-seller, had alleged affair with Erwin Rommel producing Gertrud Stemmer
 Willem P. C. Stemmer (1957–2013), Dutch scientist and entrepreneur 
 Stemmer, a small village belonging to the municipality of Büsingen am Hochrhein, Germany

See also